Come and Have a Go If You Think You're Smart Enough, also known as The National Lottery: Come and Have a Go If You Think You're Smart Enough for series 2, was a BBC National Lottery game show broadcast on BBC One from 3 April 2004 to 25 June 2005. The programme was originally hosted by Nicky Campbell for the first series until Julian Clary took over to host the show for the second series.

Transmissions

External links

2004 British television series debuts
2005 British television series endings
2000s British game shows
BBC television game shows
British game shows about lotteries